Air Kufra  was a small Libyian charter airline. It was mainly operated out of Kufra Airport. It had only one commercial aircraft, which was leased from Buraq Air, along with a cargo aircraft, an Ilyushin Il-76TD. The airline had two bases: the main base was in Tripoli, Libya, and the other was located in Kufra Airport, Al Jawf. The airline was run by Giuma Nasir (CEO) and Abdurrazag Zaatut (COO).

History
Air Kufra was a short lived airline, which reportedly had operations between 2008 and 2010. The airline also offered cargo services. Also, on February 25, 2009, Air Kufra announced it will be opening a training center in Tripoli.

Training center
The Air Kufra training center was founded in 2007, to encourage Libyans to get into aviation, and is still open. The training center operates Cessna 172s. The Cessna 172s were sold to Air Kufra in 2007 from Africair. It was the first US corporation to sell US manufactured goods into Libya after the sanctions were lifted.

Fleet
These are the only known aircraft Air Kufra had:

History
The British Aerospace Jetstream 32, tail number 5A-DGR, Serial Number 945, was delivered to Buraq Air on August 19, 2004. The plane was used by 2 prior airlines, Dong-Ah Group and British Aerospace. It was 13 years old when it was delivered, having taken its first flight on December 2, 1991. The aircraft's current status is unknown. The Ilyushin Il-76TD, tail number UN-76008 was also leased from Buraq Air. It was used by 6 prior airlines. It was delivered to Buraq Air on 26 February 2004. The plane was later passed on to the GST Aero Aircompany in March 2006. It was 21 years old when it was delivered, having take its first flight on October 31, 1983.

Operations

Destinations
These are the Air Kufra destinations (Before closing):

Passenger Services
Air Kufra provided many charter services. They were used for passenger and cargo charter services. For passenger charter, they could provide regular charter, helicopter services and desert dispatches. They are also equipped for both national and international services.

Training center
It operates 2 Cessna 172s, 5A-KFA and 5A-KFB. In order to achieve its goal of modern aircraft, its aircraft are fitted with new efficient diesel engines. Also, they were fitted with the FNPTII from Alsim. The training center is ISO 9001/2008 certified. The Training center provides training courses to become a Private Pilot and a Commercial Pilot.

References

External links 
  
 Buraq Air Website 
 Air Kufra Aviation Training Center

Defunct airlines of Libya
Airlines established in 2008
Airlines disestablished in 2010
Defunct charter airlines
Libyan brands
Economy of Tripoli, Libya